Periscope Life is the seventh album by the Dutch progressive rock band Kayak, originally released on LP in 1980. The first CD issue (1993) had 2 bonus tracks. In 1998, the album (without the bonus tracks) was part of the Double CD 3 Originals

Track listing
 "Astral Aliens" (Linders/Lapthorn/T. Scherpenzeel) – 3:48
 "What's in a Name" (T. Scherpenzeel) – 4:12
 "Stop That Song" (T. Scherpenzeel) – 3:14
 "If You Really Need Me Now" (Linders/T. Scherpenzeel) – 4:15
 "Periscope Life" (T. Scherpenzeel) – 3:24
 "Beggars Can't Be Choosers" (Linders/Lapthorn/T. Scherpenzeel) – 4:39
 "The Sight" (T. Scherpenzeel) – 3:59
 "Lost Blue Of Chartres" (T. Scherpenzeel) – 3:24
 "Anne" (Linders/T. Scherpenzeel) – 4:19
 "One Way Or Another" (T. Scherpenzeel) – 3:56
 "Sad To Say Farewell" (Linders/T. Scherpenzeel) – 4:22

Bonus tracks on CD
 "Total Loss" (Linders/T. Scherpenzeel) – 4:11
 "What's Done Is Done" (T. Scherpenzeel) – 3:39

Personnel
 Edward Reekers – lead vocals
 Johan Slager – electric and acoustic guitars
 Ton Scherpenzeel – keyboards, backing vocals
 Peter Scherpenzeel – bass guitar, recorders
 Max Werner – drums, backing vocals, percussion
 Irene Linders – backing vocals
 Katherine Lapthorn – backing vocals

Guest Musicians

 Jim Price – trombone
 Jim Gordon – saxophone, clarinet
 Lee Thornburg – trumpet, flugelhorn

References

1980 albums
Kayak (band) albums